William Francis "Wild Bill" Miller (April 12, 1910 – February 26, 1982) was a Major League Baseball pitcher who played in one game on October 2,  for the St. Louis Browns.

External links
Baseball Reference.com

1910 births
1982 deaths
St. Louis Browns players
Major League Baseball pitchers
Baseball players from Missouri